6th Division may refer to:

Infantry divisions 
6th Division (Australia)
6th Division (Austria)
6th (United Kingdom) Division
Finnish 6th Division (Winter War)
Finnish 6th Division (Continuation War)
6th Division (Reichswehr)
6th Division (German Empire)
6th Infantry Division (Wehrmacht), Germany (subsequently renamed the 6th Grenadier Division and later the 6th Volksgrenedier Division)
6th SS Mountain Division Nord, Germany
6th Infantry Division (Greece)
6th Division (Imperial Japanese Army)
6th (Poona) Division, of the British Indian Army before and during the First World War
6th Poona Divisional Area, of the British Indian Army during the First World War
6th Infantry Division (India)
6th Division (Iraq)
6th Alpine Division Alpi Graie, Kingdom of Italy
6th Infantry Division Cuneo, Kingdom of Italy
6th Division (Japan)
6th Division (North Korea)
6th Division (Norway)
6th Infantry Division (Philippines)
6th Infantry Division (Philippine Army)
6th Infantry Division (Poland)
6th Division (Singapore)
6th Infantry Division (South Korea)
6th Rifle Division (Soviet Union)
6th Infantry Division (Thailand)
6th Airborne Division (United Kingdom)
6th Infantry Division (United States)
6th Marine Division (United States)
6th Division (Yugoslav Partisan)

Cavalry Divisions 
6th Cavalry Division (German Empire)

Armour Divisions 
1st Light Division (Germany) (6th Panzer Division), German Empire
6th Armoured Division (South Africa)
6th Armoured Division (United Kingdom)
6th Armored Division (United States)
6th Armoured Division (Pakistan)